The 2010 Shanghai International Film Festival is the 13th such festival devoted to international cinema to be held in Shanghai, China. It was held from June 12–20, 2010.

2327 movies from 81 countries and regions have entered their names for Golden Goblet Award. Five northern European nations, Canada, Germany, Italy, Ireland, Japan, Israel, China and Taiwan showed their films during the Shanghai International Film Festival dedicate for the ongoing Shanghai Expo. In the festival the films echoing with environmental topics because of the World Expo Shanghai's theme "Better City, Better Life."  300 foreign and domestic films were screened in China at 25 cinemas.

The SIFF announced two film projects, CFPC (China Film Pitch and Catch) and Co-FPC (Co-production Film Pitch and Catch) to promote rising filmmakers.

In 2010 SIFFORUM successfully invited Weinstein Company CEO Harvey Weinstein, China Film Group Cooperation chairman Han San Ping, Polybona Films president Yu Dong, plus well-known Chinese directors Feng Xiaogang, He Ping, Wang Xiaoshuai, Leon Dai, Pang Ho-Cheung and Korean director Kang Je-Gyu.

The seven-member jury panel was chaired by Hollywood-based Chinese director John Woo. 
Many Chinese actresses and stars attended the open ceremony, like Lin Peng, Gan Tingting, Che Yongli, Zhang Jingchu and actor Huang Xiaoming, Gong Xinliang and Hong Kong actor Kar-Ying, Claire Danes and her husband, actor Hugh Dancy, Barbie Shu, Eddie Peng and Chinese actress Yuan Xinyu, Gong Li and actor John Cusack, Adam Brody, Li Bingbing and Hong Kong actor Daniel Wu, the Korean actress Da-hae Lee, Ruby Lin and actor Mike He, Miss World Zhang Zilin of China, Maria Grazia Cucinotta, Hong Kong actress and singer Gillian Chung and director Jeffrey Lau, the Hong Kong actress Cecilia Cheung, Chinese actress Zhao Wei, Director Feng Xiaogang and his actress wife Xu Fan and artists Wang Ziwen, Li Chen, Zhang Jingchu, Lu Yi and producer Wang Zhonglei, Yvonne Yung, Luc Besson, artists Zhang Yang, Gao Yuanyuan, Li Xiaorang, Ruby Lin, Wang Luodan and Liu Ye, and Malaysian-born international artist, Michelle Yeoh.

Jury
The jury members were:

John Woo (USA) (president of the jury)
Zhao Wei (China) 
Leos Carax (French) 
Amos Gitai (Israel)  
Bill Guttentag (USA)
Yōjirō Takita (Japan)
Wang Xiaoshuai (China)

In competition

Winners

Golden Goblet Awards

Asian New Talent Award
 Best Director
 Jeong Gi-hun (Korea) for Goodbye Mom
 Best Film
 Jiang Wenli (China) for Lan
 Jury Prix
 Jin-ho Choi (Korea) for The Executioner

See also
 16th Shanghai Television Festival June 7 to June 11
 Yang Qing

References

External links
Official website
2009 Shanghai International Film Festival
Shanghai International Film Festival
2010 Shanghai International Film Festival

Shanghai International Film Festival
Shanghai International Film Festival
Shanghai
Shanghai
21st century in Shanghai